Gabriel de Jesus Alvarez (born March 6, 1974) is a Mexican college baseball coach and former Major League Baseball third baseman for the Detroit Tigers (1998–2000) and the San Diego Padres (2000).

Playing career
A 6'1, 205 lb right-hander, Alvarez played college baseball at USC from 1993 to 1995 for head coach Mike Gillespie. In 1993 and 1994, he played collegiate summer baseball with the Chatham A's of the Cape Cod Baseball League.

Alvarez was selected by the Padres in the second round of the 1995 MLB Draft. While playing in the minor leagues for the Rancho Cucamonga Quakes in 1995, he turned an unassisted triple play as a second baseman. He caught a line drive over second base, stepped on the bag to get one runner and tagged the other one coming into second from first. He told the reporter covering the game that exactly the same thing had happened to him the previous year at USC, but he threw to first instead of tagging the runner to complete the triple play. He said a teammate had pointed out that he had missed a chance at an unassisted triple play, and he had promised himself if it ever happened again, he would do it differently.

Alvarez was taken by the Arizona Diamondbacks as the fifth pick in the 1997 MLB expansion draft, but was traded by the Diamondbacks with Matt Drews and Joe Randa to the Tigers for Travis Fryman. Alvarez made his major league debut for the Tigers on June 22, 1998, going 1–4. On July 17, 2000, he was traded by the Tigers to the Padres for Dusty Allen. He finished his major league career with 59 hits, a .222 batting average, 29 runs, and an .877 fielding percentage.

Coaching career
In 2010, Alvarez became the assistant baseball coach at the University of Southern California (USC).

References

External links

1974 births
Baseball players from Sonora
Birmingham Barons players
Chatham Anglers players
Chattanooga Lookouts players
Detroit Tigers players
Huntsville Stars players
Las Vegas Stars (baseball) players
Living people
Major League Baseball players from Mexico
Major League Baseball third basemen
Memphis Chicks players
Mexican expatriate baseball players in the United States
Mobile BayBears players
People from Navojoa
Rancho Cucamonga Quakes players
San Diego Padres players
USC Trojans baseball coaches
USC Trojans baseball players
Toledo Mud Hens players